Pentax *ist D is a digital SLR camera produced by Pentax, released in 2003. The *ist D produces a 6.1 megapixel resolution image, using same sensor as Nikon D100. It was the smallest and lightest dSLR at the time, but still well equipped. For example, it had a large and bright pentaprism viewfinder, compared to pentamirror in other similarly priced competition.

External links 

 Pentax official site
 DPReview of Pentax *ist D

Images 

ist D
Pentax K-mount cameras